Talion may refer to:
 Eye for an eye
 Trade name for Bepotastine
 Protagonist of the video games Middle-earth: Shadow of Mordor and Middle-earth: Shadow of War, who is bonded with the spirit of the Elf Celebrimbor

See also 
 Thalion (disambiguation)
 Thallium, a chemical element